HMS Ambuscade was an  of the Royal Navy and was launched in 1913. She served throughout the First World War, forming part of the Grand Fleet and taking part at the Battle of Jutland, serving in the Dover Patrol and spending the latter part of the war as a convoy escort. She was sold for scrapping in 1921.

Construction
Ambuscade was one of three s ordered from John Brown & Company of Clydebank as part of the 1911–1912 shipbuilding programme for the Royal Navy. In all, 20 Acasta-class ships were ordered as part of this programme, of which 12, including Ambuscade, were to the standard Admiralty design with the other eight ships to their builder's own designs. She was laid down, as yard number 411, on 7 March 1912 and launched on 25 January 1913. In 1912, as part of a general reorganisation of the Royal Navy's destroyers into alphabetical classes, the Acastas became the K class, and in 1913, it was decided to switch to names beginning with the class letter, with Ambuscade being allocated the name Keith, but this plan was abandoned for the class and Ambuscade completed under her original name in June 1913.

The ships had a crew of 73 officers and ratings.

The ship's main gun armament consisted of three  BL Mk VIII guns, with 120 rounds of ammunition carried per gun. Two  torpedo tubes were fitted, while two reload torpedoes could be carried. The ship was fitted with a 2-pounder "pom-pom" anti-aircraft autocannon during the First World War, while in 1918 the torpedo tubes (and possibly one of the 4-inch guns) was removed to allow a heavy depth charge armament to be carried.

Service

On commissioning, Ambuscade, with her sister ships, joined the 4th Destroyer Flotilla of the Royal Navy Home Fleet, based at Portsmouth. On the outbreak of the First World War, the 4th Flotilla, including Ambuscade, became part of the Grand Fleet.

On 15 December 1914, German battlecruisers, supported by the battleships of the main German High Seas Fleet set out on a raid against the coastal towns of Scarborough, Whitby and Hartlepool, with the intent of drawing out units of the British Grand Fleet, where they could be engaged by the battleships of the High Seas Fleet. The British, aware from radio intercepts that the Germans were planning a raid with their battlecruisers (but not that they were supported by the whole of the High Seas Fleet), sent out the battlecruiser squadron under Vice Admiral David Beatty with four battlecruisers and the Second Battle Squadron, commanded by Vice Admiral Sir George Warrender, with six battleships, to oppose the raid. Ambuscade was one of seven destroyers that sailed in support of the British battlecruiser squadron. At 05:15 on 16 December, the lead ship of the British destroyers, spotted a German destroyer,  (part of the screen of the High Seas Fleet) and set off with the other destroyers in pursuit of the German ship. In a brief exchange of fire, V155 hit Lynx twice, with Lynx turning away due to a jammed propeller, and then hit Ambuscade once below the waterline, forcing her to drop out of line with heavy flooding.

On 21 April 1916, the Grand Fleet sailed on a sortie where it would patrol off the Danish coast with the intention of distracting German attention from Russian minelaying operations in the Baltic Sea.

Ambuscade took part in the Battle of Jutland on 31 May/1 June 1916, sailing under the command of Commander Gordon A. Coles as one of 19 ships of the 4th Destroyer Flotilla in support of the Grand Fleet. During the fleet action on the evening of 31 May, the 4th Flotilla was deployed on the port side of the battleships of the Grand Fleet, on the unengaged side. During the night, the 4th Flotilla, including Ambuscade, took part in a series of attacks against the escaping German fleet. In the first attack (at about 23:30 hr), the flotilla encountered German battleships and cruisers, with the flotilla leader  being badly damaged by German shells (mainly from the battleship ) and later sinking, while  collided with the German battleship  and the German cruiser  was rammed by the battleship , with Elbing later being scuttled. None of the nine torpedoes fired by the 4th Flotilla in that attack hit. Shortly afterwards (about 23:50), the flotilla, now led by  again encountered the same group of battleships and cruisers. Rostock was hit by a single torpedo, fired by Ambuscade or Contest, and was also later scuttled. At about 00:10 hr, a third attack was made, with  being sunk and  being damaged, with none of the five torpedoes fired by the British destroyers, including Ambuscades last, striking home. By now, the flotilla had completely split up, but was to lose a fourth ship when Ardent, mistaking the German ships for British ships, was sunk by fire from German battleships.

The 4th Flotilla, including Ambuscade, left the Grand Fleet and moved to the Humber in July 1916, with the role of protecting British minesweepers and deterring German minelayers off the East coast of England. Late in the year, in a response to the Battle of Dover Strait, where a raid by German torpedo boats on the Dover Strait resulted in the loss of the destroyer , several drifters, it was decided to strengthen British naval forces in the English Channel. The 4th Flotilla was transferred to Portsmouth for anti-submarine operations while Ambuscade was one of five destroyers that were transferred from the 4th to the 6th Destroyer Flotilla, part of the Dover Patrol, to reinforce the defences of the Dover Strait. Ambuscade joined the 6th Flotilla on 21 November 1916. On the night of 25/26 February 1917, German torpedo boats attempted another raid against the Dover Barrage and Allied shipping in the Dover Straits, with one flotilla attacking the Barrage and a half flotilla of torpedo boats operating off the Kent coast. Ambuscade was one of a group of destroyers and cruisers protecting shipping anchored in the Downs. The German force sent against the Downs was spotted near the north entrance to the Downs, prior to shelling Margate and Westgate-on-Sea. While the division of ships including Ambuscade sortied against this force, they did not manage to find the German force. The southern German force withdrew following an exchange of gunfire with the destroyer . Ambuscade was again part of the force protecting the Downs when the Germans raided again on the night of 17/18 March 1917. Again, the German plan involved multiple attacks, against the Dover Barrage and off the Kent coast. The destroyer  was sunk during the German attack against the Barrage, with  being torpedoed but surviving when investigating the attack. The northern German force torpedoed and sunk a merchant ship anchored outside the entrance to the Downs, and then shelled Ramsgate and Broadstairs before withdrawing. They were spotted by the British torpedo boat  which signaled for help, summoning the naval force protecting the Downs, including Ambuscade, but again the German force managed to escape without being engaged.

On 4 April 1917 Ambuscade left the 6th Flotilla, rejoining the 4th Flotilla, now based at Devonport and employed on convoy escort duties. She and Cockatrice attacked with depth charges with no apparent result. Ambuscade was still part of the 4th Destroyer Flotilla in August 1918, but by the end of the war had joined the Northern Patrol Force based at Dundee. By June 1919, Ambuscade had been reduced to reserve at Devonport.

Disposal
She was sold for scrap to Petersen & Albeck of Denmark on 6 September 1921.

Pennant numbers

Notes

Citations

References

External links
 Battle of Jutland Crew Lists Project - HMS Ambuscade Crew List

 

Acasta-class destroyers
World War I destroyers of the United Kingdom
1913 ships
Ships built on the River Clyde